Petersville is an unincorporated community in Clay Township, Bartholomew County, in the U.S. state of Indiana.

History
A post office was established at Petersville in 1873, and remained in operation until it was discontinued in 1900. The community was named for its founder, Peter T. Blessing.

Geography

References

Unincorporated communities in Bartholomew County, Indiana
Unincorporated communities in Indiana